Drewsen is a surname. Notable people with the surname include:

Brita Drewsen (1887–1983), Swedish artist and businesswoman
Gudrun Løchen Drewsen (1867–1946), Norwegian-born American women's rights activist and painter
Johan Christian Drewsen (1777-1851), Danish manufacturer and politician